James Everett Prewitt (born November 12, 1942) is an American novelist and former Army officer who served in the Vietnam War.

Novels
Prewitt's debut novel, Snake Walkers, won the Bronze award in the General Fiction category of ForeWord Magazine's Book of the Year Award. In 2006, Snake Walkers was also honored by the Black Caucus of the American Library Association.  It won First Place for Fiction at the Los Angeles Black Book Expo in March 2005 and 2nd place at the Independent Book Awards held in New York City in 2005. Snake Walkers also won first place in the USA Best Book Awards 2005.

Prewitt's second novel, A Long Way Back, was published in 2015. It received the Seal of Approval from Literary Classics, and was also a finalist for the Montaigne Award, and the INDIEFAB Book of the Year Award. A Long Way Back won the Independent Publishers of New England first place award, the Silver Award from Literary Classics, and the Silver Award from the Military Writers Society of America (MWSA).

Prewitt's third novel, Something About Ann, was published November 2017.

Education
Prewitt received his bachelor's degree from Lincoln University, Pennsylvania and a master's degree from Cleveland State University. He was awarded the title of distinguished alumni from both schools.

References

External links
 

1942 births
Living people
Cleveland State University alumni
American male novelists
Lincoln University (Pennsylvania) alumni
Writers from Cleveland
African-American novelists
United States Army personnel of the Vietnam War
20th-century African-American people
21st-century African-American people
African-American male writers